Baiser or Le Baiser may refer to

Art
Le Baiser (fr), painting by Toulouse-Lautrec
Le Baiser (Rodin), sculpture

Books
Le Baiser (fr), short story by Maupassant 1882

Music
Baiser, Japanese band
Le Baiser (album), album by Indochine 1990
"Le Baiser", song by Indochine from Le Baiser 1990